William Murray Tuke (1822-1903), was a British tea merchant and banker.

Early life
William Murray Tuke was born in 1822, the son of Samuel Tuke and Priscilla Hack, the daughter of James Hack of Chichester, and his wife, Hannah Jeffreys.

Career
Tuke was a tea merchant and a banker. He had a "substantial tea business in York".

Personal life
He married Emma Williams (1822-1908) Their son William Favill Tuke (1863-1940) became a banker, serving as the Chairman of Barclays Bank from 1934 to 1936.

Death
Tuke died in 1903.

References

1822 births
1903 deaths
British bankers
William Murray
Businesspeople in tea
19th-century British businesspeople